was a corporate brand name that was used by two previously connected video game developers and publishers based in Japan. The original Jaleco company was founded in 1974 as Japan Leisure Company, founded by Yoshiaki Kanazawa, before being renamed to simply Jaleco in the early 1980s. This company was later acquired in 2000 by PCCW, who rebranded it as their Japanese game division, PCCW Japan, before reverting it to Jaleco in 2002. In 2006, Jaleco became independent from PCCW and renamed to Jaleco Holding, having their video game operations spun off into a new company, also called Jaleco. This new spin-off company was sold to mobile developer Game Yarou in 2009, with Jaleco Holding renaming itself to Encom Holdings shortly after.

Jaleco is known for its arcade and home console video games produced in the 1980s and early 1990s, including City Connection, Bases Loaded, Ninja JaJaMaru-kun, Exerion, Idol Janshi Suchie-Pai and Rushing Beat. Jaleco also produced arcade cabinets for other game developers, alongside redemption arcade games and UFO catcher claw machines. In the past, the company produced amusement park equipment and aquarium parts, under their JAQNO brand name. Their North American division, Jaleco USA, published a number of titles for the NES and SNES, including Maniac Mansion, Pinball Quest and R-Type III.

In 2014, Jaleco's parent company Game Yarou filed for bankruptcy, causing Jaleco to vanish from the video game industry. The company's video game assets would be purchased by City Connection, an indie Japanese studio that continues to use their games for other side projects and licensing deals (the company itself being named after one of Jaleco's games). The original Jaleco company, Encom Holdings, quit the video game business in 2009, citing stiff competition in the industry, instead dealing in real estate. Encom dissolved in 2013, and was delisted from the JASDAQ that same year.

History

Jaleco was founded by Japanese businessman Yoshiaki Kanazawa on October 3, 1974. The company was originally based out of Setagaya-ku, Tokyo.

Japan Leisure began production of arcade video games by 1982, and changed their corporate name to Jaleco, an anagram of their older name, in March 1983. Jaleco begian production of home console video games for the Nintendo Entertainment System in Japan. Towards the mid 1980s, Jaleco would begin production of equipment for aquarium tanks, which were released under their JAQNO brand name. A North American office, Jaleco USA, opened in Wheeling, Illinois – this division commonly published other third-party video games for both the NES and SNES consoles, notably Maniac Mansion and R-Type III, alongside distribution of Jaleco video games in the United States.

In late 1993, Jaleco's North American division departed from the arcade game scene, becoming solely a producer of games for home platforms. By 2000, Jaleco was struggling financially, being unable to produce a hit video game in several years. To keep the company afloat, Jaleco was acquired by Hong Kong-based company PCCW on November 1, 2000, where they became the Japanese division of the company, renamed to PCCW Japan. Heavy company restructuring was performing, with Jaleco's arcade division and other non-profitable areas of the company shuttering while retaining their home console video game division. In April 2001, PCCW Japan purchased the VR-1 Group, the holder of North American MMO developer VR-1 Entertainment, in order to have their operations expand globally. In October 2002, PCCW Japan merged Jaleco USA and VR-1 Entertainment into a new company, Jaleco Entertainment, relocating to Buffalo, New York. PCCW Japan was renamed back to Jaleco in 2004. They would continue to operate for several years as a subsidiary of PCCW, producing video games for home consoles and Japanese mobile phones, alongside soundtrack albums and applications for web browsers.

In August 2005, PCCW sold off Jaleco to Sandringham Fund SPC, alongside the subsidiary company Hyperlink Investments Group. On May 31, 2006, Jaleco's board of directors renamed the company to Jaleco Holding, having their video game operations spun-off into a new company also known as Jaleco, which would become a subsidiary of Jaleco Holding. The corporate restructure was done in order to establish the company's non-video game products. In October 2007, Hyperlink Investments Group sold its stock in Jaleco Holding to Game Yarou, a Japanese mobile phone developer, and two South Korean corporations, STIC Pioneer Fund and A2i. Jaleco Holdings dissolved two subsidiary companies, FFBC Investment and J Consulting, in early 2008. Jaleco's North American division, Jaleco Entertainment, closed their doors later that year.

On January 15, 2009, Jaleco Holding sold off Jaleco to Game Yarou for a total of ¥1 (US$0.01); however, Game Yarou soon assumed ¥700,000,000 ($7.736 million) of Jaleco Holding's ¥16,000,000,000 ($17.68 million) loan. A spokesperson for Jaleco Holding cited "increasing competition in recent years in the video game market" as the reason for the company's retirement in the industry, which was proving to be difficult for the company to stay afloat. Under ownership from Game Yarou, Jaleco produced video games for Japanese mobile phones and web browsers, alongside licensing many of their older video games to third-party developers for use in other projects. On March 2, 2009, Jaleco announced that it would release a video game for the Wii, Ougon no Kizuna, on May 28 of that year.

By 2012, Game Yarou was in a financial crisis due to high debt and poor sales of their mobile titles – they were officially declared bankrupt by the Tokyo District Court on May 21, 2014. Jaleco would soon vanish from the video game industry, with their video games being acquired later that year by Japanese company City Connection, formerly known as Clarice Disk. The company continues to use Jaleco video games for a number of projects, alongside licensing them out to other developers for use in other products. Jaleco Holding renamed itself to Encom Holdings in April 2009, focusing on real estate and finance business in Japan and no longer being involved with video games. Encom Holdings dissolved on May 13, 2013, and was delisted from the JASDAQ that same day, due to poor reputation and loss of income.

Games

Arcade
Blue Print (1982, Japanese distribution only, developed by Ashby Computers and Graphics)
Check Man (1982, released by Zilec-Zenitone in the UK)
Naughty Boy (1982, released by Cinematronics in North America)
Pop Flamer (1982, released by Stern-Seeburg in North America)
Chameleon (1983, developed by Donga-Seiko)
Exerion (1983, released in North America by Taito)
Grasspin (1983, developed by Ashby Computers and Graphics)
Dingo (1983, developed by Ashby Computers and Graphics)
Saturn (1983, developed by Ashby Computers and Graphics)
Top Roller (1983, topped Japanese arcade chart in October 1983)
D-Day (1984)
Formation Z (1984, released by Williams in North America as Aeroboto)
Gate-In! Wai Wai Jockey (1984, Japan-exclusive, developed by Casio)
Parallel Turn (1984)
Pinbo (1984)
City Connection (1985, developed by Hect, released by Kitkorp in North America as Cruisin)
Field Combat (1985)
Vs. Ninja JaJaMaru-Kun (1985, Japan-exclusive)
Argus (1986, developed by NMK)
Momoko 120% (1986, Japan-exclusive)
Valtric (1986, developed by NMK)
Butasan (1987, Japan-exclusive, developed by NMK)
Exerizer (1987, released by Nichibutsu in North America as Sky Fox)
Psychic 5 (1987)
Ginga NinkyouDen (1987)
Arm Champs (1988, Japan-exclusive)
Dynamic Shoot Kyousou (1988, Japan-exclusive)
Ninja Kazan (1988)
Kick Off: Jaleco Cup (1988, Japan-exclusive)
Legend of Makai (1988, developed by NMK)
Moero!! Pro Yakyuu Homerun Kyousou (1988, Japan-exclusive)
NEW Moero!! Pro Yakyuu Homerun Kyousou (1988, Japan-exclusive)
P-47: The Phantom Fighter (1988)
Shingen: Samurai-Fighter (1988, Japan-exclusive)
Big Run: The Supreme 4WD Challenge: 11e Rallye (1989)
Hachoo! (1989, Japan-exclusive)
Jitsuryoku!! Pro Yakyuu (1989, Japan-exclusive)
Mahjong Daireikai (1989, developed by NMK, Japan-exclusive strip mahjong game)
Plus Alpha (1989)
Saint Dragon (1989, developed by NMK)
Alien Command (1990, ticket redemption game)
Cisco Heat (1990)
Ganbare JaJaMaru Saisho wa Goo (1990, Japan-exclusive)
Mahjong Channel Zoom In (1990, Japan-exclusive strip mahjong game)
Mahjong Kakumei (1990, Japan-exclusive strip mahjong game)
Rod Land (1990)
Big III: 3Reel Roulette (1990, Japan-exclusive)
64th Street: A Detective Story (1991, developed by C.P. Brain)
Avenging Spirit (1991, developed by C.P. Brain)
Earth Defense Force (1991)Grand Prix Star (1991)Joyful Cards: Jaleco 5Reel Poker (1991, Japan-exclusive)Circus Circus (1991, Japan-exclusive)Arabian Nights (1991, Japan-exclusive)Wonder Hunting (1991, Japan-exclusive)Mini Hunting (1991, Japan-exclusive)Gun Baron (1991)Arm Champs II (1992)Big Striker (1992, developed by C.P. Brain)Mahjong Kakumei 2: Princess League (1992, Japan-exclusive strip mahjong game)Soldam (1992)Wild Pilot (1992)B.O.T.S.S.: Battle of the Solar System (1992, North American distribution only, developed by MicroProse)Jokers Wild (1992, Japan-exclusive)Draw Poker (1992, Japan-exclusive)Four Jokers (1992, Japan-exclusive)Raise Bet Poker (1992, Japan-exclusive)Axis Bells (1992, Japan-exclusive, originally released by Wing as Lucky Bells)Slot Match: 3Reel Slot (1992, Japan-exclusive)Wonder Hunting II (1992, Japan-exclusive)Captain Flag (1993, Japan-exclusive)VS Super Captain Flag (1993, Japan-exclusive)Cybattler (1993)F-1 Grand Prix Star II (1993)Hayaoshi Quiz Ouza Ketteisen: The King of Quiz (1993, Japan-exclusive)Idol Janshi Suchie-Pai Special (1993, Japan-exclusive strip mahjong game)Peek-a-Boo! (1993, erotic game)Super Strong Warriors (1993, Japan-exclusive)Rolling Panic (1993, Japan-exclusive, originally released by Excellent System as Dream 9 Final)Basket Bull (1993, North America-exclusive ticket redemption game)Best Bout Boxing (1994)F-1 Super Battle (1994)Hayaoshi Quiz Grand Champion Taikai (1994, Japan-exclusive)Hayaoshi Quiz Nettou Namahousou (1994, Japan-exclusive)Idol Janshi Suchie-Pai II (1994, Japan-exclusive strip mahjong game)World PK Soccer (1994)Scud Hammer (1994, Japan-exclusive)Battle K-Road (1994, North American distribution only, originally released by Psikyo)Gunbird (1994, North American distribution only, originally released by Psikyo)Alley Cats (1994, North America-exclusive ticket redemption game)Spider Stompin (1994, North American distribution only, originally released by Island Design)Spider Splattin (1994, North American distribution only, originally released by Island Design)
Desert War (1995, developed by NMK)
The Game Paradise: Master of Shooting! (1995)
Mahjong Angel Kiss (1995, Japan-exclusive strip mahjong game)
P-47 Aces (1995, developed by NMK)
Tetris Plus (1995)
Super Circuit Red Zone (1995)
Gratia: Second Earth (1996)
Ryuusei Janshi Kirara Star (1996, Japan-exclusive strip mahjong game)
Super GT 24h (1996)
World PK Soccer V2 (1996)
Skating Shot (1996, Japan-exclusive prize redemption game)
Over Rev (1997)
Tetris Plus 2 (1997)
Vs. Janshi Brandnew Stars (1997, Japan-exclusive strip mahjong game)
Puzzle Uo Poko (1997, developed by Cave)
Match Three (1997, North America-exclusive ticket redemption game, developed by HanaHo Games)
Idol Janshi Suchie-Pai III (1999, Japan-exclusive strip mahjong game)
VJ: Visual & Music Slap (1999, Japan-exclusive rhythm game)
VJ: Visual & Music Slap DASH (1999, Japan-exclusive rhythm game)
Rave Master (1999, Japan-exclusive rhythm game)
Stepping Stage (1999, Japan-exclusive rhythm game)
Stepping Stage Special (1999, Japan-exclusive rhythm game)
Stepping Stage 2 SUPREME (1999, Japan-exclusive rhythm game)
Stepping 3 SUPERIOR (1999, Japan-exclusive rhythm game)
Rock'n Tread (1999, Japan-exclusive rhythm game)
Rock'n Tread 2 (1999, Japan-exclusive rhythm game)
Rock'n MegaSession (1999, Japan-exclusive rhythm game)
Rock'n 3 (1999, Japan-exclusive rhythm game)
Dream Audition (2000, Japan-exclusive rhythm game)

PC
Fighter Ace (1997, developed by VR-1)
UltraCorps (1997, developed by VR-1)
Fighter Ace II (1999, developed by VR-1)
Fighter Ace 3.5 (2002, developed by Ketsujin Studios)
Trailer Park Tycoon (2002)
World Championship Pool 2004 (2004, developed by Blade Interactive)
Room Zoom: Race for Impact (2004, developed by Blade Interactive)

MSX
Top Roller (1984, released in Europe by Eaglesoft)
Exerion II: Zorni (1984, released in Europe by Eaglesoft as Zorni)
D-Day (1984, released in Europe by Eaglesoft)
Formation Z (1985, released in Europe by Eaglesoft)
Snake Runner (1986, released by Eaglesoft)
Alien 8 (1986, Japanese distribution only, licensed from Ultimate Play the Game)
Gunfright (1986, Japanese distribution only, licensed from Ultimate Play the Game)
City Connection (1986, released in Europe by Eaglesoft)
Ninja-kun: Majou no Bouken (1986, released in Europe by Eaglesoft as Ninja)
Ninja JaJaMaru-kun (1986, released in Europe by Eaglesoft as Ninja II)
Mississippi Satsujin Jiken: Murder on the Mississippi (1987, Japan-exclusive)
Break In (1987, Japanese distribution only, licensed from Eaglesoft)
Moero!! Nettou Yakyuu '88 (1988, Japan-exclusive)

NES/Famicom
Exerion (1985, Japan-exclusive, developed by TOSE)
Formation Z (1985, Japan-exclusive, developed by Hect)
Ninja-Kun: Majou no Bouken (1985, Japan-exclusive, developed by TOSE)
Field Combat (1985, Japan-exclusive, developed by TOSE)
City Connection (1985, developed by Axes Art Amuse)
Ninja JaJaMaru-kun (1985, Japan-exclusive, developed by TOSE)
Argus (1986, Japan-exclusive, developed by TOSE)
Choplifter (1986, Japan-exclusive, developed by TOSE)
JaJaMaru no Daibouken (1986, Japan-exclusive, developed by TOSE)
Urusei Yatsura: Lum no Wedding Bell (1986, Japan-exclusive, developed by TOSE)
Mississippi Satsujin Jiken: Murder on the Mississippi (1986, Japan-exclusive, developed by TOSE)
Knight Lore: Majou no Ookami Otoko (1986, Famicom Disk System, developed by TOSE)
Fuuun Shaolin Ken (1987, Famicom Disk System, developed by TOSE)
Youkai Club (1987, Japan-exclusive, developed by TOSE)
Bases Loaded (1987, developed by TOSE)
Monty no Doki Doki Daidassou: Monty on the Run (1987, Famicom Disk System)
Bio Senshi Dan: Increaser to no Tatakai (1987, Japan-exclusive, developed by Atlus)
Esper Boukentai (1987, Japan-exclusive, developed by NMK)
Ucuusen Cosmo Carrier (1987, Japan-exclusive, developed by TOSE)
Druid: Kyoufu no Tobira (1987, Famicom Disk System)
Racket Attack (1988, developed by TOSE)
Fuuun Shaolin Ken: Ankoku no Maou (1988, Famicom Disk System, developed by TOSE)
Wizards & Warriors (1988, Japanese distribution only, developed by Rare)
Radical Bomber!! Jirai-Kun (1988, Famicom Disk System)
Bases Loaded II: Second Season (1988, developed by TOSE)
Big Challenge! Judo Senshuken (1988, Famicom Disk System)
Maniac Mansion (1988)
Big Challenge! Dogfight Spirit (1988, Famicom Disk System)
Saiyuuki World (1988, Japan-exclusive, developed by NMK)
Hoops (1988, developed by Aicom)
Chuugoku Senseijutsu (1988, Japan-exclusive, developed by Aicom)
Goal! (1988, developed by TOSE)
Robowarrior (1988, North American & European distribution only, developed by Hudson Soft)
JaJaMaru Ninpou Chou (1989, Japan-exclusive, developed by NMK)
Big Challenge! Gun Fighter (1989, Famicom Disk System)
Big Challenge! Go Go Bowling (1989, Famicom Disk System)
Shin Moero!! Pro Yakyuu (1989, Japan-exclusive, developed by TOSE)
Okkotoshi Puzzle Tonjan!? (1989, Japan-exclusive, developed by NMK)
Terao no Dosukoi Oozumou (1989, Japan-exclusive, developed by TOSE)
Pinball Quest (1990, developed by TOSE)
The Astyanax (1990)
JaJaMaru Gekimaden: Maboroshi no Kinmajou (1990, Japan-exclusive)
Moero!! Judo Warriors (1990, Japan-exclusive)
Bases Loaded 3 (1990, developed by TOSE)
Totally Rad (1990, developed by Aicom)
A Boy and His Blob: Trouble on Blobolonia (1990, Japanese distribution only, developed by Imagineering)
Whomp 'Em (1990)
Metal Mech: Man & Machine (1990, developed by Sculptured Software)
The Last Ninja (1991, North America-exclusive, developed by Beam Software)
Ninja JaJaMaru: Ginga Daisakusen (1991, Japan-exclusive)
Bases Loaded 4 (1991, developed by TOSE)
Tsurupika Hagemaru: Mezase! Tsuruseko no Akashi (1991, Japan-exclusive)
Shatterhand (1991, North American & European distribution only, developed by Natsume)
Pizza Pop! (1992, Japan-exclusive, developed by Arc System Works)
Rampart (1992, North America-exclusive, developed by Bitmasters)
Plasma Ball (1992, Japan-exclusive)
Toukon Club (1992, Japan-exclusive, developed by Natsume)
Goal! Two (1992, developed by TOSE)
Rod Land (1992, developed by The Sales Curve)
Cyberball (1992, North America-exclusive, developed by Tengen)
The Young Indiana Jones Chronicles (1992, North America-exclusive, developed by Chris Gray Enterprises)
Mezase! Top Pro: Green ni Kakeru Yume (1993, Japan-exclusive)
Pro Sport Hockey (1993, developed by TOSE)

Super NES/Super Famicom
Big Run: The Supreme 4WD Challenge: 13e Rallye (1991, Japan-exclusive)
Super Bases Loaded (1991, developed by TOSE)
Earth Defense Force (1991)
Rival Turf! (1992)
Goal! (1992, developed by TOSE)
Super Bases Loaded 2 (1992, developed by TOSE)
Super Professional Baseball II (1992, Japan-exclusive, developed by TOSE)
King Arthur's World (1992, developed by Argonaut Games)
Brawl Brothers (1992)
Pro Sport Hockey (1993, developed by TOSE)
Tuff E Nuff (1993)
Operation Logic Bomb: The Ultimate Search & Destroy (1993)
Bishoujo Janshi Suchie-Pai (1993, Japan-exclusive strip mahjong game, developed by K.K. DCE)
Utopia: The Creation of a Nation (1993, North American distribution only, developed by Gremlin Interactive)
Super Goal! 2 (1993, developed by TOSE)
The Peace Keepers (1993)
Kingyo Chuuihou! Tobidase! Game Gakuen (1994, Japan-exclusive)
Jurassic Park (1994, Japanese distribution only, developed by Ocean Software)
Super Ninja-kun (1994, Japan-exclusive)
HammerLock Wrestling (1994)
R-Type III (1994, North American distribution only, developed by Irem)
The Ignition Factor (1994)
Takeda Nobuhiro no Super League Soccer (1994, Japan-exclusive, developed by TOSE)
JWP Joshi Pro Wrestling: Pure Wrestle Queens (1994, Japan-exclusive)
Super Bases Loaded 3: License to Steal (1994, developed by TOSE)
Sterling Sharpe: End 2 End (1995, North America-exclusive, developed by TOSE)

GameCube
Super Bubble Pop (2003, North America-exclusive, developed by Runecraft)
Goblin Commander: Unleash the Horde (2003)
Room Zoom: Race for Impact (2005, North America-exclusive, developed by Blade Interactive)
World Championship Pool 2004 (2005, Europe-exclusive, developed by Blade Interactive)

Wii
Zenkoku Dekotora Matsuri (2008, Japan-exclusive, developed by Suzak)
Ougon no Kizuna (2009, Japan-exclusive, developed by TownFactory)

Game Boy
Hero Shuugou!! Pinball Party (1990, Japan-exclusive)
Bases Loaded for Game Boy (1990, developed by TOSE)
Maru's Mission (1990, developed by TOSE)
The Rescue of Princess Blobette (1990, Japanese distribution only, developed by Imagineering)
Battle Unit Zeoth (1990)
In Your Face (1990, North America-exclusive)
Fortified Zone (1991)
Banishing Racer (1991, Japan-exclusive)
Q*bert for Game Boy (1992, developed by Realtime Associates)
Ikari no Yousai 2 (1992, Japan-exclusive)
WordZap (1992, North America-exclusive, developed by Realtime Associates)
Rampart (1992, developed by C-Lab)
Avenging Spirit (1992)
Dirty Racing (1993, Japan-exclusive, developed by Gremlin Interactive)
Rod Land (1993, developed by Eurocom)
Goal! (1993, developed by TOSE)
Soldam (1993, Japan-exclusive)
Tetris Plus (1996, Japanese distribution only, developed by Natsume)
The Fidgetts (1997, North American distribution only, developed by Game Over Productions)
Dr. Franken II (1997, North America-exclusive, developed by MotiveTime)
Hayaoshi Quiz Ouza Ketteisen: The King of Quiz (1998, Japan-exclusive quiz game)

Game Boy Color
Get Mushi Club: Minna no Konchuu Daizukan (1999, Japan-exclusive)
Pocket Bowling (1999, North American distribution only, developed by Athena)

Game Boy Advance
Kawaii Pet Shop Monogatari 3 (2002, Japan-exclusive, released as PCCW Japan)
Sea Trader: Rise of Taipan (2002, North America-exclusive)
Scan Hunter: Sen Nen Kaiuo wo Oe! (2002, Japan-exclusive, released as PCCW Japan, developed by DA1)
Darius R (2002, Japan-exclusive, released as PCCW Japan, developed by RideonJapan)
Toukon Heat (2002, Japan-exclusive, released as PCCW Japan)
Jazz Jackrabbit (2002, developed by Game Titan)
Karnaaj Rally (2002, developed by Paragon 5)
Super Bubble Pop (2003, North America-exclusive, developed  by Runecraft)
JaJa-Kun Jr. Denshouki (2004, Japan-exclusive)
Moero!! Jaleco Collection (2004, Japan-exclusive)

Nintendo DS
Brain Buster Puzzle Pak (2006, Japanese distribution only, developed by Suzak)
Chuukana Janshi Tenhoo Painyan Remix (2006, Japan-exclusive strip mahjong game)
Puchi Puchi Virus (2007, released in North America by NIS America)
Idol Janshi Suchie-Pai III Remix (2007, Japan-exclusive strip mahjong game)
Nep League DS (2007, Japan-exclusive)
Denjirou Sensei no Fushigi na Jikkenshitsu (2008, Japan-exclusive)
Chou!! Nep League DS (2008, Japan-exclusive)
Imasugu Tsukaeru Mamechishiki: Quiz Zatsugaku-Ou DS (2010, Japan-exclusive quiz game)
WiZmans World (2010, Japan-exclusive RPG)

PlayStation
Idol Janshi Suchie-Pai Limited (1995, Japan-exclusive strip mahjong game)
Bases Loaded '96: Double Header (1995)
Slam Dragon (1996, Japan-exclusive)
Tetris Plus (1996, developed by Natsume
Idol Janshi Suchie-Pai II Limited (1996, Japan-exclusive strip mahjong game)
Turf Wind '96: Take Yutaka Kyousouba Ikusei Game (1996, Japan-exclusive, developed by TOSE)
Tokyo Highway Battle (1996, North American & European distribution only, developed by Genki)
Ninja JaJaMaru-kun: Onigiri Ninpouchou (1997, Japan-exclusive, developed by Infinity)
BRAHMA Force: The Assault on Beltlogger 9 (1997, North American & European distribution only, developed by Genki)
Fantastep (1997, Japan-exclusive)
Cheesy (1997, Japanese distribution only, developed by CTA Developments)
Mini-Yonku Bakusou Kyoudai: Let's & Go!!: WGP Hyper Heat (1997, Japan-exclusive, developed by C-Lab)
Speed Racer (1998, North American distribution only, developed by Graphic Research)
GunBare! Game Tengoku 2: The Game Paradise 2 (1998, Japan-exclusive)
Suchie-Pai Adventure Doki Doki Nightmare (1998, Japan-exclusive erotic game)
T: Kara Hajimaru Monogatari (1998, Japan-exclusive)
Bakusou Kyoudai Let's & Go!! Eternal Wings (1998, Japan-exclusive)
Dragonseeds (1998)
Nectaris: Military Madness (1998, North American distribution only, developed by Matrix Software)
Punky Skunk (1998, North American distribution only, developed by Ukiyotei)
Battle Konchuuden (1999, Japan-exclusive)
Irritating Stick (1999, North American distribution only, developed by Saurus)
Option Tuning Car Battle 2 (1999, Japan-exclusive, developed by MTO)
K-1 Revenge (1999, North American distribution only, developed by Daft)
Juggernaut (1999, North American distribution only, developed by Will)
Vampire Hunter D (1999, North American distribution only, developed by Victor Interactive Software)
Shiibas 1-2-3 Destiny! (2000, Japan-exclusive)
K-1 Grand Prix (2000, North American distribution only, developed by Daft)
Vanark (2000, North American distribution only, developed by Bit Town)
Builder's Block (2000, North American distribution only, developed by Taito)
Super Bubble Pop (2002, North America-exclusive, developed by Runecraft)
Jaleco Collection Vol. 1 (2003, Japan-exclusive, released as PCCW Japan)

PlayStation 2
Stepping Selection (2000, Japan-exclusive)
Rock'n MegaStage (2000, Japan-exclusive)
Dream Audition (2000, Japan-exclusive)
Dream Audition 2 (2000, Japan-exclusive)
Super Micchan (2001, Japan-exclusive)
Dream Audition 3 (2001, Japan-exclusive)
Dream Audition Super Hit Disc 1 (2001, Japan-exclusive)
Dream Audition Super Hit Disc 2 (2001, Japan-exclusive)
Raging Blades (2002, released as PCCW Japan)
Hooligan: Kimi no Naka no Yuuki (2002, Japan-exclusive, released as PCCW Japan)
Baldur's Gate: Dark Alliance (2002, Japanese distribution only, released as PCCW Japan, developed by Snowblind Studios)
Toukon Inoki Michi: Puzzle de Daa! (2002, Japan-exclusive, released as PCCW Japan, developed by Matrix Software)
Idol Janshi R: Janguru Project (2002, Japan-exclusive strip mahjong game, released as PCCW Japan)
Lowrider (2002)
Sweet Legacy (2002, Japan-exclusive, released as PCCW Japan, developed by Frontwing)
Goblin Commander: Unleash the Horde (2003)
Otona no Gal Jan: Kimi ni Hane Man (2003, Japan-exclusive strip mahjong game, released as PCCW Japan')World Championship Pool 2004 (2004, North America-exclusive, developed by Blade Interactive)Shin Bakusou Dekotora Densetsu Tenka Touitsu Choujou Kessen (2005, developed by Spike)Room Zoom: Race for Impact (2005, Europe-exclusive, developed by Blade Interactive)World Super Police (2005, developed by Suzak)Otona no Gal Jan 2 (2005, Japan-exclusive strip mahjong game)Idol Janshi Suchie-Pai IV (2007, Japan-exclusive strip mahjong game)

XboxNightCaster II: Equinox (2002)Super Bubble Pop (2002)Pulse Racer (2002, North America-exclusive)Goblin Commander: Unleash the Horde (2003)World Championship Pool 2004 (2003, developed by Blade Interactive)Room Zoom: Race for Impact (2004, developed by Blade Interactive)Kingdom Under Fire: The Crusaders (2005, Japanese distribution only, developed by Phantagram)

Sega SaturnIdol Janshi Suchie-Pai Special (1995, Japan-exclusive strip mahjong game)Idol Janshi Suchie-Pai Remix (1995, Japan-exclusive strip mahjong game)Bases Loaded '96: Double Header (1995)Idol Janshi Suchie-Pai II (1996, Japan-exclusive strip mahjong game)Tetris Plus (1996, developed by Natsume)Turf Wind '96: Take Yutaka Kyousouba Ikusei Game (1996, Japan-exclusive)Fantastep (1997, Japan-exclusive)Game Tengoku: The Game Paradise! (1997, Japan-exclusive)Ninja JaJaMaru-kun: Onigiri Ninpouchou Gold (1997, Japan-exclusive)Suchie-Pai Adventure Doki Doki Nightmare (1998, Japan-exclusive erotic game)GT24 (1998, Japan-exclusive port of Super GT 24h)Idol Janshi Suchie-Pai Mecha Genteiban (1998, Japan-exclusive strip mahjong game)Idol Janshi Suchie-Pai Secret Album (1999, Japan-exclusive strip mahjong game)

Sega DreamcastIdol Janshi wo Tsukucchaou (1999, Japan-exclusive strip mahjong game)Carrier (2000)

WonderSwanGanso JaJaMaru-kun (1999)Moero!! Pro Yakyuu Rookies (2000, developed by TOSE)

3DOIdol Janshi Suchie-Pai Special (1995, Japan-exclusive strip mahjong game)

Mobile
 (2004, Japan-exclusive, developed by Inoki International)
 (2009, Japan-exclusive, developed by Mobileday)
 (2009, Japan-exclusive, developed by Mobileday)

Prototypes/cancelled gamesExerion (NES, 1985, cancelled North American release)Block Buster (Arcade, 1987, also known as Bombs Away)Vs. Great Tennis (Arcade, 1988)Bashi Bazook: Morphoid Master (1988, cancelled North American release of Bio Senshi Dan: Increaser tono Tatakai)Counter Force (Arcade, 1989)R&T (Arcade, 1990, European prototype of Rod Land)Super Dog Booby: Akachan Daibouken no Maki (Famicom, 1990, developed by Taito)Taro's Quest (NES, 1990, cancelled North American release of JaJaMaru Ninpou Chou)In Your Face (Arcade, 1991, developed by Jaleco USA)Squashed (NES, 1991, cancelled North American release of Ninja JaJaMaru: Ginga Daisakusen)War on Wheels (NES, 1991, developed by Sculptured Software)Chimera Beast (Arcade, 1993, developed by C.P. Brain)Kick for the Goal (Arcade, 1994, prototype version of World PK Soccer)Crossroads (1999, PC, developed by VR-1)Navy Force (2000, PS2)Rock'n 4 (2000, Japan-exclusive rhythm game)Carrier 2: The Next Mutation (2001, PS2)Lost Continents (2003, PC, developed by VR-1)World Championship Pool 2004 (2005, GameCube, North American release cancelled)Ninja JaJaMaru-kun: Pen wa Ken Yorimo Kyoushidegozaru'' (2006, DS)

References

External links

Jaleco Ltd.  
SCROLL Issue 08: The Totally Loaded and Fortified Irritating Spirit of Battle Unit Jaleco

City Connection (company)
Video game companies of Japan
Video game companies established in 1974
Video game companies established in 2006
Video game companies disestablished in 2014
1974 establishments in Japan
2014 disestablishments in Japan
Defunct video game companies of Japan
Holding companies based in Tokyo
Amusement companies of Japan
Software companies based in Tokyo
Pacific Century Group
Video game development companies
Re-established companies
Japanese companies established in 1974
Japanese companies disestablished in 2014
Holding companies disestablished in 2014
Holding companies established in 2006